The 2003 Open Gaz de France was a women's tennis tournament played on indoor hard courts at the Stade Pierre de Coubertin in Paris in France that was part of Tier II of the 2003 WTA Tour. It was the eleventh edition of the tournament and was held from 3 February through 9 February 2003. First-seeded Serena Williams won the singles title.

Finals

Singles

 Serena Williams defeated  Amélie Mauresmo 6–2, 6–3
 It was Williams's 1st title of the year and the 32nd title of her career.

Doubles

 Barbara Schett /  Patty Schnyder defeated  Marion Bartoli /  Stéphanie Cohen-Aloro 2–6, 6–2, 7–6 (7–5)
 It was Schett's only title of the year and the 10th title of her career. It was Schnyder's only title of the year and the 11th of her career.

External links 
 ITF tournament edition details

Open Gaz de France
Open GDF Suez
Open Gaz de France
Open Gaz de France
Open Gaz de France
Open Gaz de France